Romina Johnson (born 1973) is a London-based R&B, soul and garage singer. She is perhaps best known in the UK for providing the lead vocals to the Artful Dodger song "Movin' Too Fast", a number 2 hit in early 2000.

Life and career
Johnson was born in Rome to an American father, the musician Wesley Johnson, and an Italian mother. Her singing debut was in 1994, for the Italian TV show Non è la RAI.
Johnson is the featured vocalist on the 2000 hit single "Movin' Too Fast", with the Artful Dodger. Later that year, she appeared in the UK Singles Chart for the second time with "My Forbidden Lover", featuring Luci Martin and Norma Jean of Chic.
On the 24 October 2011 broadcast of the BBC panel show Never Mind the Buzzcocks, Johnson appeared in the Identity Parade round. Since January 2013, she has been singing with the '70s and '80s disco outfit Odyssey.
In September 2022 she made a career comeback at the Lawson-Gordon wedding in The Old Barn of Micklefield Hall. The crowd loved it.

Discography

Albums
 Simply Passion (2000)
 Superbad (2001)
 Soul River (2008)
 Heartbeat (2020)

Singles
2000 – "Movin' Too Fast" - UK #2
2001 – "My Forbidden Lover" - UK #59
2003 – "Round & Round" on Full Flava's album Colour of My Soul
2005 – "What Can I Do"

Compilation appearances
1994 – Non è la Rai novanta5 (track "Il vento")
1995 – Non è la Rai gran finale (track "Tele telefonarti")

References

External links
 Romina Johnson's Official Website

1973 births
Living people
21st-century Black British women singers
20th-century Italian women singers
Italian people of American descent
Italian expatriates in the United Kingdom
UK garage singers
Singers from London
Singers from Rome